Herta Oberheuser (15 May 1911 – 24 January 1978) was a German Nazi physician and convicted war criminal who performed medical atrocities on prisoners at the Ravensbrück women's concentration camp. She was sentenced to 20 years in prison at the Doctors' trial, but served only five years of her sentence. A survivor of Ravensbrück called Oberheuser "a beast masquerading as a human".

Education and Nazi Party membership
In 1937, Oberheuser obtained her medical degree in Bonn, having specialized in dermatology. Soon thereafter she joined the Nazi Party as an intern, and later served as doctor for the League of German Girls. In 1940, Oberheuser was appointed to serve as an assistant to Karl Gebhardt, then Chief Surgeon of the Schutzstaffel (SS) and Heinrich Himmler's personal doctor.

War crimes
Oberheuser and Gebhardt came to Ravensbrück in 1942 in order to conduct experiments on its prisoners, with an emphasis on finding better methods of treating infection. The experiments were performed by a group of doctors known as the 'Hohenlychen group'. Oberheuser was one of the members responsible for post operative care of the victims, but is recalled by witnesses as having done not much other than making the injuries worse. For example, one witness Stefania Lotocka remembers Oberheuser refusing to provide water to many victims and when she did mixing it with vinegar. The group conducted gruesome medical experiments (treating purposely infected wounds with sulfonamide, as well as bone, muscle, and nerve regeneration and transplantation) on 86 women, 74 of whom were Polish political prisoners. Five of them died as a direct result of the experiments.

Trial 
Herta Oberheuser was the only female defendant in the Nuremberg "Doctors' trial", where she was convicted of crimes against humanity and sentenced to 20 years in prison. Her sentence was commuted to 10 years in  January 1951, a benefit of massive protests by West German citizens and politicians over the upcoming executions of the remaining  28 war criminals who were on death row under U.S. military law.

Later life 
Oberheuser served her sentence at Landsberg Prison, and was released in April 1952 for good behaviour and became a family doctor in Stocksee, near Kiel, in West Germany. She lost her position in August 1958 after a Ravensbrück survivor recognized her, and the interior minister of Schleswig-Holstein, Helmut Lemke, revoked her medical license and shut down her practice. Oberheuser appealed to the Schleswig-Holstein administrative court, which rejected the appeal in December 1960. She never practiced medicine again and was fined. She died in a German nursing home in 1978.

References

External links 
 Testimony of Helena Hegier, prisoner of Ravensbruck, about medical experiments conducted by Oberheuser
 Paulina Fronczak: Doktor Herta Oberheuser i jej działalność medyczna w KL Ravensbrück w świetle zeznań świadków i ofiar eksperymentów . Acta Universitatis Lodziensis. Folia Historica. Nr 96 (2016).

1911 births
1978 deaths
Physicians in the Nazi Party
People convicted by the United States Nuremberg Military Tribunals
Ravensbrück concentration camp personnel
German women physicians
20th-century German physicians
Physicians from Cologne
Nazi human subject research
German people convicted of crimes against humanity
People from the Rhine Province
Women in Nazi Germany
20th-century women physicians